Lady Deathstrike (Yuriko Oyama), occasionally spelled "Deathstryke", is a supervillain appearing in American comic books published by Marvel Comics. She is a foe of the X-Men, especially Wolverine.

Her father Lord Dark Wind created the adamantium-bonding process that was forced on Wolverine by Weapon X. A self-styled warrior, Lady Deathstrike hired the villain Spiral’s "body shoppe" to bond adamantium to her own skeleton in addition to other cyber-genetic enhancements. She has since worked as a mercenary and assassin and feels a need to prove herself by killing Wolverine. Lady Deathstrike is also the sister of human crime lord Lord Deathstrike/Kazuo Oyama. She, along with former X-Men members Mystique, Sabretooth, Domino, Warpath, and Old Man Logan formed a team called Weapon X-Men, but later changed to Weapon X-Force after Logan and Warpath left with Omega Red.

A mutant version of Lady Deathstrike, played by Kelly Hu and without any of Deathstrike's backstory, appeared as a brainwashed henchman of William Stryker in the 2003 film X2.

Publication history

She first appeared as Yuriko Oyama in Daredevil #197 (August 1983) and later as Lady Deathstrike in Alpha Flight #33 (April 1986). Yuriko Oyama was created by writer Dennis O'Neil and artist Larry Hama. Writers Bill Mantlo and Chris Claremont added defining characteristics such as her cyborg abilities, while artist Barry Windsor-Smith designed her cyborg appearance.

Fictional character biography

Yuriko Oyama (大山 ゆりこ Oyama Yuriko) was born in Osaka, Japan. Her father was Lord Dark Wind (Kenji Oyama), a Japanese crime lord and criminal scientist who created the process by which adamantium can be bonded to bone. Kenji was a former Japanese kamikaze pilot during World War II. His face was horribly scarred in a failed suicide attack on an American battleship. Feeling ashamed by his failure decades earlier, he scarred the faces of Yuriko and her two brothers in a ritual design. Her two brothers later died while in their father's service.

Yuriko teamed up with Daredevil to free her lover, Kiro, from her father's servitude, and to take vengeance on her father for her scarring and the death of her two brothers. She guided Daredevil to Lord Dark Wind's private island in search of Bullseye. However, when Yuriko slew Lord Dark Wind, the devoted Kiro chose suicide to honor his master.

Distraught, Yuriko belatedly embraced her father's ideals and sought to track down whoever dishonored him and restore Japan's honor. She adopted a costumed identity, as a samurai warrior. She attempted to find Bullseye with an adamantium tracking device, intending to get revenge on him for betraying her father and retrieve the adamantium in his bones for study. Instead, the device led to Wolverine, whose skeleton had also been bonded with adamantium. Deathstrike sought to kill him to right the wrong of the theft of her father's theories and to restore her family's honor; however, she and her followers were defeated by Wolverine and Vindicator of Alpha Flight. She then went to the Mojoverse and sought Spiral's "body shoppe" where she received extensive cybernetic enhancements including adamantium bones and talons. As a cyborg, she became a professional criminal, and joined forces with former Hellfire Club mercenaries-turned-cyborgs Cole, Macon, and Reese. The four cyborgs stalked Wolverine and Katie Power in New York.

Lady Deathstrike — along with Cole, Macon, and Reese — joined the team of criminal cyborgs called the Reavers, led by Donald Pierce. Together, the Reavers captured and crucified Wolverine. Lady Deathstrike was accidentally teleported along with Wolverine and Puck to 1937 Spain. There, she joined forces with a Luftwaffe unit, and battled Wolverine. Her right arm was destroyed by a tank, and when she returned to the present she was given a new right arm. The Reavers gang was broken up by Trevor Fitzroy's Sentinels and most of them were destroyed, though Deathstrike herself survived. She later battled Wolverine and Sabretooth in Times Square.

At times she has resigned her quest to kill Logan and has even worked with the X-Men cooperatively toward a common goal, such as the defeat of Stryfe. In an encounter with Logan shortly after Magneto removed the adamantium from his skeleton, Lady Deathstrike again encounters Puck and Vindicator. The fight with Wolverine destroys much of Vindicator's house and ends when Wolverine reveals his bone claws. As Logan no longer possessed the adamantium stolen from her father, she concluded there was no honor to be gained by killing him. She leaves the premises peacefully. However, she still remains a mercenary and an assassin. Despite all this, Yuriko is set apart from many of the X-Men's foes in that she adheres to an honor code, despite being emotionally disturbed.

When Captain America unexpectedly appears in Japan after a year spent in another dimension, he manages to find Lady Deathstrike working with terrorists. Their goals were to drive American influence out of Japan, by any means possible, including mass murder. Captain America defeats her before any innocent lives are lost.

Lady Deathstrike resurfaced as an ally of William Stryker. She displays a new ability to access the Internet via her cybernetics but this led to her being co-opted and controlled by Mount Haven's computer systems.

Lady Deathstrike was responsible for mutilating and nearly killing Sunfire, whose legs she severed in battle.

Following her confrontation with Rogue and Sunfire, Lady Deathstrike resurfaced as a member of one of the United States government's Army of Thunderbolts in the super hero Civil War, temporarily released from prison in order to go after the Secret Avengers, who resisted the Superhuman Registration Act. She fights alongside other criminals such as Venom, Jester, Bullseye, Jack O'Lantern, Taskmaster, and Songbird. She participates in the final battle of the Civil War in Times Square, New York City, before being sent to the Negative Zone Prison.

Lady Deathstrike returns during the Messiah Complex story to play an important role in the series, facing off against X-23. This was confirmed by IGN Comics, who, in their editorial analysis "13 Days of Messiah Complex," revealed that Deathstrike would be leading a new team of Reavers throughout the event. As reported, Lady Deathstrike appears alongside the Reavers, now made up of nameless Purifiers with armor and weapons instead of any former members. Having allied with the Purifiers to destroy mutant-kind, Lady Deathstrike leads the new Reaver team against the New X-Men, gravely wounding Hellion in the process. Her armor was destroyed by X-23 and Rockslide. She appears again in pursuit of Cable and the mutant newborn where she battled X-Force and X-23 again and X-23 nearly kills her.

Lady Deathstrike is apparently saved from death due to the actions of Spiral, as she is later seen under repair in Spiral's Body Shoppe when Madelyne Pryor approaches Spiral with an invitation of membership in her Sisterhood of Mutants. Despite not originally being approached to join the Sisterhood, Lady Deathstrike accepts Pryor's offer nonetheless. It appears that while Spiral repaired Lady Deathstrike's body, she also gave her a more submissive personality, as during missions with the Sisterhood, she continually does whatever she is told, while referring to Spiral as "Mistress". After the Sisterhood resurrects Psylocke, they finally make their move on the X-Men, with Lady Deathstrike being tasked to take down Wolverine, by piercing his lungs. Lady Deathstrike kept Wolverine busy while the Sisterhood raided his room for one of his most treasured possessions: a lock of Jean Grey's hair.

Lady Deathstrike later reappeared with the Reavers. Still driven for revenge against Wolverine, Lady Deathstrike worked with the Reavers to suicide-bomb Utopia. However, when X-Force intervened, Lady Deathstrike escaped her body via Internet.

During the Ends of the Earth storyline, Lady Deathstrike was seen in one of Doctor Octopus's facilities in Australia. When Kangaroo II enters this facility, Lady Deathstrike ambushes and kills him in one swift swipe from her claw.

Lady Deathstrike and the Reavers are later seen in the Core, an underground city populated by robots. She does battle with Captain Britain after the Secret Avengers arrive in the city in search of Ant-Man.

Lady Deathstrike's consciousness was later uploaded in the body of Ana Cortes, establishing a symbiotic relationship with Ana's consciousness. Cortes was a teenage Latin female that has returned to Bogota, Colombia from boarding school after the death of her father to inherit her deceased father's kingdom. She then traveled to the Jean Grey Academy alongside her friend Reiko to find Karima Shapandar and retrieve the Omega Sentinel technology. Deathstrike and her team see her jogging with Monet, and attempt to ambush them. During the confrontation, Karmina is shot, and Monet manages to protect her temporarily, until Monet gets caught off guard. Before Deathstrike could finish her attack, Karmina shoots, and injures Lady Deathstrike causing her to retreat to regroup and get more intel. She then learns of Arkea, and has hired Typhoid Mary to help her achieve this goal. Deathstrike and Typhoid Mary argue with John Sublime about Arkea and they manage to get information out of him that there was more than one piece of Arkea that was alive, as the one they had was dead and not viable. Mary knocks Sublime unconscious and she and Deathstrike manages to escape before Psylocke comes to check on Sublime. Deathstrike and Mary makes their way to Troms, Norway, where they find Amora, who has been exiled by Thor and stripped of her powers. Deathstrike promises Amora that she will make her powerful once again. Amora brings Deathstrike and Mary to where the Arkea meteorite is located when Mary wants to renegotiate the terms of her hire and want to become partners. Deathstrike says it was not just a partnership, but the formation of a new Sisterhood of Mutants. With the live Arkea taking possession of Reiko, she empowers Deathstrike, Mary and Amora. Deathstrike and her Sisterhood manage to escape the X-Men and Monet with Arkea activating several sentinels under the ocean. The mental conflict between Ana and Yuriko made Lady Deathstrike increasingly unstable. Ana Cortes grew to regret her life as a supervillain and did not like the direction Arkea was leading the Sisterhood. She notified the X-Men of the Sisterhood's location, after she became increasingly concerned about Arkea's bold moves such as having Amora resurrect Selene Gallio, the Black Queen. Ana flipped out and tried to get Typhoid Mary to kill her, but Mary refused. Upon Arkea asking Ana to come be a part of the procedure to resurrect Madelyne Pryor, Ana killed herself to prevent Arkea from using her further. Ana's death didn't stop Arkea's plans. Arkea simply removed Yuriko's consciousness from Ana's body and placed it in Reiko's body along with Arkea's own. Ana's body was spliced with Jean Grey's DNA in order to enable it to host Madelyne Pryor's consciousness. Amora then completed the resurrection of Madelyne Pryor. After the X-Men's confrontation with the Sisterhood, Karima leaves the X-Men to team up with Sabra and investigate the Cortes crime family. Though Arkea was destroyed by the X-Men, Lady Deathstrike's consciousness remained intact inside Reiko's body.

The Reavers later arrived in Killhorn Falls with Lady Deathstrike and attempt to hunt down Logan for good. As the Reavers attacked Killhorn Falls, Old Man Logan single-handedly killed all the Reavers soldiers and confronted Lady Deathstrike before saving Maureen. After being wounded multiple times, Logan manages to defeat Lady Deathstrike, as she started limping away when Logan blacked out. Thinking that he failed to protect Maureen from the chaos, Logan decided to set-off to find Lady Deathstrike.

While in hiding during the "Weapons of Mutant Destruction" storyline, Lady Deathstrike is discovered and captured by the new Weapon X. While held in their captivity, she is experimented on. This experiment led to her nanotechnology being used in their creation of Weapon H.

During the "Hunt for Wolverine" storyline, Lady Deathstrike is seen at Chester's Bar where she tells Daken and Sabretooth about what the Reavers discovered when they went after Wolverine and that he has recently been sighted alive. The three of them go on the trail of Wolverine where they arrive in Maybelle, Arizona. Sabretooth and Lady Deathstrike continue searching Maybelle for Wolverine when they are attacked by zombies made from those at a birthday party. One of them bites Sabretooth as Lady Deathstrike gets him away from the zombies. Both of them wonder where the zombies came from. As they get to their car, it suddenly explodes. Sabretooth starts running and finds that his zombie bite is not healing. Sabretooth comes across more zombies as he starts killing them with Lady Deathstrike not far behind him. Both of them take refuge in a garage. When Daken catches up to them, Lady Deathstrike and Sabretooth are informed of a glowing green device in the power station that has to do with the zombies and they must fight their way past the zombies to destroy it before Maybelle is burned to the ground. While fighting zombies and Soteira Killteam Nine, Lady Deathstrike discovers that one of the soldiers from Soteira Killteam Nine is a zombified version of her father who stabs Lady Deathstrike. Lady Deathstrike recovers and continues her fight with her father until Lord Dark Wind cuts off her left hand. Using her right hand, Lady Deathstrike stabs her father in the neck. Then she does the same thing to a zombified Graydon Creed. After telling Sabretooth that the adamantium they tracked was her father's adamantium and learning that Daken is dead, Lady Deathstrike accompanies Sabretooth to where the glowing device is and destroy the device before Maybelle can be burned to the ground. The next day, Sabretooth and Lady Deathstrike carjack someone outside a diner as Sabretooth suggests to Lady Deathstrike to have her Reaver friends get her a new hand. Lady Deathstrike tells Sabretooth to shut up and drive.

Powers and abilities
Lady Deathstrike was transformed into a cyborg by Spiral and the "Body Shop" using alien technology of Mojo's dimension, with later modifications by Donald Pierce. She has superhuman strength, speed, stamina, durability, and agility. Deathstrike's skeleton has been artificially laced with molecules of adamantium, rendering her skeletal structure physically unbreakable. Later, in the pages of Uncanny X-Men, it was shown that Spiral used magic to infuse the metal into Deathstrike's body. Aside from being as indestructible as her skeleton, these talons are capable of slicing through virtually any substance, other than adamantium itself and Captain America's shield. She is capable of telescoping these claws to twice their usual length. She also had the ability to interface with computers, allowing direct data access to her brain's memory centers. Although her normal form is visibly that of a cyborg, she uses disguises when necessary. She is a trained assassin and is skilled in a variety of Asian martial arts. Lady Deathstrike is especially skilled with swords, and while she prefers stealth and subtlety in her killings, she is emotionally disturbed and this interferes with her effectiveness. Deathstrike suffers from mental instability; she is an unbalanced fanatic, a condition worsened by her transformation into a cyborg.

Before she received her cybernetic enhancements, Deathstrike used a special five-foot steel katana that was electromagnetically tempered and sheathed in energy.  The energy sheath enabled the sword to cut through most substances and made it as resilient as adamantium. She has also used shuriken, nunchakus, a high-powered long-range blaster which fires armor-piercing explosive bullets, and wrist-bands containing adamantium detectors. She also wore a modified traditional Japanese battle-armor which could withstand even superhuman blows. Her items were constructed by weapon-smiths of Lord Dark Wind's organization.

Deathstrike later received an upgrade that provides her with a kind of "cybernetic healing factor" that functions similarly, although not as efficiently, to Wolverine's.

Lady Deathstrike is fluent in both English and Japanese, and an accomplished pilot of various air and sea-craft.

The left side of Yuriko Oyama's face was scarred in a ritual design by her father; this was apparently surgically repaired when she became a cyborg.

Lady Deathstrike's original body was destroyed. She became a digital consciousness. She was downloaded into Ana Cortes, who became her host and the new Lady Deathstrike until Ana killed herself. Yuriko's mind was placed into the body of her friend Reiko, who currently hosts her.

Reception

Accolades 

 In 2009, IGN ranked Lady Deathstrike 78th in their "Top 100 Comic Book Vilains" list.
 In 2019, CBR.com ranked Lady Deathstrike 6th in their "Marvel: Old Man Logan Villains" list.
 In 2019, IGN ranked Lady Deathstrike 20th in their "Top 25 Marvel Villains" list.
 In 2021, Screen Rant included Lady Deathstrike in their "10 Marvel Characters Fans Would Love To See In Marvel's Wolverine" list.
 In 2022, CBR.com ranked Lady Deathstrike 9th in their "10 Deadliest Female Villains In Marvel Comics" list.

Other versions

Amalgam
In the Amalgam Comics universe, Lady Deathstrike was merged with Talia al Ghul of DC Comics and became Lady Talia. She was the lover of Logan Wayne aka Dark Claw, but swore revenge when Dark Claw murdered her father, Ra's Al-Pocalypse, to prevent him from unleashing a deadly chemical on the world. She became cybernetically enhanced and ambushed Dark Claw in his cave after tying up his sidekick, the Sparrow. In a choice between love and revenge, she nearly murders Logan, but his healing factor allows him to recover from the injury.

Ultimate Marvel
Lady Deathstrike has also appeared in Ultimate Marvel's Ultimate X-Men line. There, her connection lies mainly with Storm, instead of Wolverine as in the original storyline. As Yuriko (or 'Yuri'), she taught Storm how to hotwire vehicles and be a car thief. The two later had a falling out, and Yuri ended up being run over by a truck. Yuri survived, but needed to use a wheelchair. There, Dr. Cornelius of Weapon X offered to have her shattered body rebuilt with adamantium, extendable claws, and an accelerated healing factor based on Wolverine's DNA, which would allow her to have her revenge against Storm, though if she wanted to kill Storm she would have to kill Storm's friend Wolverine as well. Yuri agreed, and underwent the modifications. She later went after Storm and Wolverine, but was defeated, and later imprisoned by S.H.I.E.L.D.

While imprisoned at the Triskelion, she encountered the X-Men Dazzler and Angel (who were out searching for their friends, elsewhere in the base). After Dazzler taunted Yuri, saying how Storm had mentioned her to them, the power went out, allowing Yuri to escape her cell and stab Dazzler through the stomach. Before she could do anything else, the mutant Longshot (another prisoner at the Triskelion) snapped Yuri's neck. Whether or not this attack killed her is unknown. She has previously survived being struck by lightning and smashed by a falling tree. Dazzler survived Yuri's attack, remaining in a coma for a few weeks before awakening.

In other media

Television

Lady Deathstrike appears in the X-Men: The Animated Series two-part episode "Out of the Past", voiced by Jane Luk. This version was previously in a romantic relationship with Wolverine before joining the Reavers and becoming a cyborg to avenge the death of her father, Professor Oyama.

Film

 Lady Deathstrike appears in X2, portrayed by Kelly Hu. This version is a brainwashed mutant and assistant to William Stryker.
 Lady Deathstrike appears in Hulk Vs Wolverine, voiced by Janyse Jaud.  This version is a member of Team X.

Video games
 Lady Deathstrike appears as a playable character in X-Men: Next Dimension, voiced by Gwendoline Yeo. This version is a member of the Brotherhood of Mutants.
 Lady Deathstrike appears as the final boss of X2: Wolverine's Revenge, voiced again by Gwendoline Yeo.
 Lady Deathstrike appears as a boss in X-Men Legends II: Rise of Apocalypse, voiced by Kim Mai Guest. This version is an associate of Apocalypse.
 Lady Deathstrike appears as a boss in X-Men: The Official Game, voiced by Vyvan Pham. This version is a student of the Silver Samurai and agent of HYDRA.
 Lady Deathstrike appears as a boss in Wolverine: Adamantium Rage.
 Lady Deathstrike appears as a mini-boss in Marvel Ultimate Alliance 2, voiced by Jocelyn Blue. She is among the supervillains injected with Iron Man's control nanites and tasked with fighting those who oppose the Superhuman Registration Act.
 Lady Deathstrike appears in Strider Hiryu's ending in Ultimate Marvel vs. Capcom 3.
 Lady Deathstrike appears as a boss in Marvel Heroes, voiced by Minae Noji.
 Lady Deathstrike appears as a playable character in Marvel Strike Force.

References

External links
 Lady Deathstrike at Marvel.com
 Deliver Us From Deathstrike at UncannyXmen.net
 

Characters created by Dennis O'Neil
Comics characters introduced in 1983
Cyborg supervillains
Female film villains
Fictional female assassins
Fictional female martial artists
Fictional female swordfighters
Fictional henchmen
Fictional Japanese people
Fictional kenjutsuka
Fictional lords and ladies
Fictional mass murderers
Fictional melee weapons practitioners
Fictional swordfighters in comics
Fictional women soldiers and warriors
Marvel Comics characters who can move at superhuman speeds
Marvel Comics characters with accelerated healing
Marvel Comics characters with superhuman strength
Marvel Comics cyborgs
Marvel Comics female supervillains
Marvel Comics film characters
Marvel Comics martial artists
Marvel Comics mutates
Wolverine (comics) characters
X-Men supporting characters